Bouchara (subtitled "chanson d'amour") is a 1981 work for mixed chamber ensemble by Canadian composer Claude Vivier. It was originally intended to serve as an interlude for his unfinished opera Rêves d'un Marco Polo (1983-), but was published independently of the opera after weeks of deliberation. A typical performance lasts around twelve minutes.

Composition
The piece was premiered on 14 February 1983, at the Centre Georges Pompidou in Paris, France.

Program notes
The notes given by Vivier in the finished manuscript:

Instrumentation
The work is written for a mixed ensemble of solo soprano, wind quintet, string quintet, and percussion battery.

Woodwinds
Flute
Oboe
Clarinet
Horn in F
Bassoon
Percussion
Balinese gong
Chinese gong
Tam-tam
Tubular bells
Bass drum
Magnetic tape
Strings
2 Violins
Viola
Cello
Bass
Voice
Soprano

References

Citations

Sources

External links
 

1981 compositions
Compositions by Claude Vivier
Compositions that use extended techniques
Modernist compositions